The Nova Avanhandava Dam is an embankment dam with gravity sections on the Tietê River about  southwest of Buritama in São Paulo state of Brazil. It supports a  hydroelectric power station. The dam was completed in 1982 and its three  Kaplan turbine-generators were commissioned by the same year. It is owned and operated by AES Tietê. The dam also provides for navigation with two ship locks.

References

External links

Dams completed in 1982
Energy infrastructure completed in 1982
Dams in São Paulo (state)
Embankment dams
Hydroelectric power stations in Brazil
Locks of Brazil
1982 establishments in Brazil